The Chilton Times-Journal is a weekly newspaper based in Chilton, Wisconsin. The Thursday paper is primarily distributed in Calumet County, Wisconsin. It has a circulation of approximately 4400. The newspaper is owned by Calumet Press, Inc..

The newspaper serves Chilton, Hilbert, Stockbridge, and other parts of Calumet County.

History
The Chilton Times was started in 1857. C. W. Fitch was the first editor/publisher, and John P. Hume was the printer/manager. Fitch sold the newspaper to Hume eight months later, and Hume became the editor. The newspaper was 100% Democratic.  William J. McHale bought the Times in 1932, and it was combined with the Journal. Numerous people owned the newspaper between 1932 and 1979. The Times Journal added the Calumet County Shopper and Badger Sportsman to its lineup during that period. The paper was purchased by Gary Vercauteren in 1979, and he sold it to its current owner James Moran in August 2001. The current editor is Ben Rodgers.

References

Chilton Times Journal, Retrieved January 4, 2007, Warning: commercial link

External links
Official website

Chilton Times-Journal
Chilton Times-Journal
1857 establishments in Wisconsin